The Delaware First Nation is a Lenape First Nation in southern Ontario and is a member nation of the Six Nations of the Grand River. Its reserves include the shared Glebe Farm 40B and Six Nations of the Grand River First Nation reserves.

References 

Lenape
First Nations governments in Ontario